Chorab  or Chorabie  is a village in the administrative district of Gmina Łysomice, within Toruń County, Kuyavian-Pomeranian Voivodeship, in north-central Poland.

During the Second World War it was the location of a subcamp of Stutthof concentration camp.

References

Villages in Toruń County